The Dunga Oil Field is an oil field located in Mangystau Region.

See also

Dead Kultuk
Dead kuluruik

References 

awdawdawd

Oil fields of Kazakhstan
Oil fields of the Soviet Union